Adelaide of Normandy (or Adeliza) ( 1030 – bef. 1090) was the ruling Countess of Aumale in her own right in 1069–1087. She was the sister of William the Conqueror.

Life
Born  1030, Adelaide was an illegitimate daughter of the Norman duke Robert the Magnificent. Adelaide's brother or half-brother, Robert's son and successor William the Conqueror, was likewise illegitimate.

Adelaide's first marriage to Enguerrand II, Count of Ponthieu potentially gave William a powerful ally in upper Normandy. But at the Council of Reims in 1049, when the marriage of William with Matilda of Flanders was prohibited based on consanguinity, so were those of Eustace II, Count of Boulogne and Enguerrand of Ponthieu, who was already married to  Adelaide. Adelaide's marriage was apparently annulled c.1049/50 and another marriage was arranged for her, this time to Lambert II, Count of Lens, younger son of Eustace I, Count of Boulogne forming a new marital alliance between Normandy and Boulogne. Lambert was killed in 1054 at Lille, aiding Baldwin V, Count of Flanders against Emperor Henry III. 

Now widowed, Adelaide resided at Aumale, probably part of her dower from her first husband, Enguerrand, or part of a settlement after the capture of Guy of Ponthieu, her brother-in-law. As a dowager Adelaide began a semi-religious retirement and became involved with the church at Auchy presenting them with a number of gifts. In 1060 she was called upon again to form another marital alliance, this time to a younger man Odo, Count of Champagne. Odo seems to have been something of a disappointment as he appears on only one of the Conqueror's charters and received no land in England; his wife being a tenant-in-chief in her own right.

In 1082, William and his wife, Matilda, gave to the abbey of the Holy Trinity in Caen the town of Le Homme in the Cotentin with a provision to the Countess of Albamarla (Aumale), his sister, for a life tenancy. In 1086, as Comitissa de Albatnarla, as she was listed in the Domesday Book, was shown as having numerous holdings in both Suffolk and Essex, one of the very few Norman noblewomen to have held lands in England at Domesday as a tenant-in-chief.  She was also given the lordship of Holderness which was held after her death by her 3rd husband, Odo, the by then disinherited Count of Champagne; the lordship then passed to their son, Stephen. Adelaide died before 1090.

Family

Adelaide married three times; first to Enguerrand II, Count of Ponthieu (died 1053) by whom she had  issue:

 Adelaide, living 1096.

She married secondly Lambert II, Count of Lens (died 1054), they had a daughter:

Judith of Lens, m. Waltheof Earl of Huntingdon and Northumbria.

Adelaide married thirdly in 1060 Odo, Count of Champagne (d. aft. 1096), by whom she had a son:

Stephen, Count of Aumale.

References

Notes

External links
 Adelaide, Countess of Aumale at opendomesday.org

1030s births
1080s deaths
House of Normandy
French countesses
11th-century French nobility
11th-century French women
11th-century women rulers